This is a compilation of the results of the teams representing Norway at official international women's football competitions, that is the UEFA Women's Cup and its successor, the UEFA Women's Champions League.

As of the 2016–17 edition Norway stands 12th in the UWCL's association rankings, and it is thus the last of twelve association currently awarded two spots in the competition, closely followed by Switzerland. Its major successes to date came in the UEFA Women's Cup era, with two appearances in the semifinals by Kolbotn and Trondheims-Ørn.

Teams
These are the six teams that have represented Norway in the UEFA Women's Cup and the UEFA Women's Champions League.

Historical progression

Results by team

Avaldsnes

Kolbotn

Lillestrøm

Røa

Stabæk

Trondheims-Ørn

References

Women's football clubs in international competitions
Women